The Tswalu Kalahari Reserve is a privately owned game reserve in the Northern Cape, South Africa. It is South Africa's largest private game reserve, covering an area of over 111,000 hectares.

History
The Tswalu Game Reserve in the Southern Kalahari was created by Stephen Boler. He bought dozens of farms to create a conservation reserve, introducing African wildlife back into their natural habitat, including lions, rare types of antelope, giraffes, buffalos, and zebras. The reserve is home to the world's largest population of black rhinos. To control the numbers and create a form or revenue to support the estate, there was a controversial hunting side called Tarkuni. After Stephen Boler's untimely death in 1998 on his way to Tswalu, he specified in his will that Nicky Oppenheimer should have first refusal on Tswalu, and the Oppenheimer family now owns and operates it.

Hunting was stopped by the Oppenheimers and some man-made structures, farm buildings and fences were removed. New land was added to extend and protect habitats and territories. Tswalu now holds the largest population of black rhino alongside other threatened species like the pangolin and canid African wild dog.

Tswalu Kalahari (lodge)
Tswalu Kalahari is a luxury private lodge in the reserve, a member of National Geographic Unique Lodges of the World. There are nine suites at the Motse Lodge, with the private Tarkuni having five suites.

Big Five game
The reserve boasts four of the 'big five', the exception being elephant.

Conservation
Tswalu Kalahari reserve is part of the Diamond Route. The conservation work of Nicky and Strilli Oppenheimer was recognized with the WWF-Lonmin Award from the World Wide Fund for Nature in 2007.

References

Game reserves of South Africa
Protected areas of the Northern Cape